The Polythoridae are a family of damselflies. They are found in New World tropics. The family contains 58 species.

Subfamilies and genera include:
Euthorinae
Euthore
Miocorinae
Miocora
Stenocora
Polythorinae
Chalcopteryx
Cora
Polythore

See also 
 List of damselflies of the world (Polythoridae)

References

 
Odonata families